The 1899 Victorian Football League finals series was the 3rd annual edition of the VFL final series, the Australian rules football tournament staged to determine the winner of the 1899 VFL season. The series ran over four weekends in August and September 1899, culminating with the 1899 VFL Grand Final at the Junction Oval on 16 September 1899.

All eight teams from the 1899 VFL season qualified for the finals series. The system used was the same as the previous season.

Matches 
The clubs were divided into two groups for the sectional rounds as follows.

Sectional Round Results

Sectional Round 1

Sectional Round 2

Sectional Round 3

Sectional ladders

Grand Final

References 

1899 in Australian rules football
Australian Football League